is a Japanese television jidaigeki or period drama that was broadcast in 1978. It is the 11th in the Hissatsu series. The drama is a sequel to Shin Hissatsu Shiokinin. Mitsuko Kusabue plays same role as she played in Hissatsu Hitchū Shigotoya Kagyō.

Plot
Osie and Sinji are former couple but they are still killing villains with money together.

Cast
Makoto Fujita as Nakamura Mondo
Tatsuo Umemiya as Shinji
Mitsuko Kusabue as Osei
Shōhei Hino as Shōuhachi
Izumi Ayukawa 
Mari Shiraki as Nakamura Ritsu
Kin Sugai as Nakamura Sen

References

1978 Japanese television series debuts
1970s drama television series
Jidaigeki television series